Ogbonnaya is a Nigerian name. Notable people with the name include:

Chris Ogbonnaya (born 1986), American football running back 
Nnamdi Ogbonnaya (born 1990), American multi-instrumentalist musician
Ogbonnaya Onu (born 1951), Nigerian politician, author, and engineer

Surnames of Nigerian origin